Everyone's Kitchen  is a South Korean television program that aired on Olive.

A pilot episode was aired on December 29, 2018 at 18:00 (KST). The program became regular beginning February 24 until April 28, 2019, and aired on Sundays at 19:40 (KST).

Program
The program mainly focuses on "Social Dining", which is what was lacking a lot following an increase in small families and single families. Kang Ho-dong, the main protagonist of the show, has only been eating together with friends he knew for many years throughout his entertainment career (Lee Soo-geun, Eun Ji-won, and friends he knew from filming of 2 Days & 1 Night), and thought he has been tired of it. He also rarely had meals together with other casts of his other programs. Therefore, he attempts to reunite with his old friends and get to know new friends through his own cooking.

The casts and guests invited for this program mostly have experience in cooking or living alone and they will each whip up a dish based on their own recipe(s) that they want to share.

Starting from episode 4, there is a semi-fixed segment in the program titled "Kkura Show", which besides allowing Sakura Miyawaki to strengthen her Korean, she can get to learn hosting, variety skills and interviewing skills under the guidance of Kang Ho-dong.

Cast
Kang Ho-dong
Lee Chung-ah (absent for episode 6)
Hwang Kwang-hee (absent for episodes 5, 9-10)
Kwak Dong-yeon (absent for episodes 2, 4, 6-11)
Sakura Miyawaki (IZ*ONE) (absent for episodes 3, 5, 7, 10)

Episodes

Notes

References

South Korean reality television series
2018 South Korean television series debuts
Korean-language television shows